Robert Ainsworth may refer to:
Bob Ainsworth (born 1952), politician
Robert Ainsworth (lexicographer) (1660–1743), English Latin lexicographer
Robert A. Ainsworth Jr. (1910–1981), United States federal judge
Robert Anthony Ainsworth, British material scientist